The Curse is the third studio album by American heavy metal band Omen. It was originally released in 1986 by Metal Blade. In 1996, Metal Blade re-released The Curse with the EP Nightmares as bonus tracks.

This is the final studio album recorded by Omen's original lineup.

Track listing

Personnel
Omen
 J.D. Kimball – vocals
 Kenny Powell – guitars
 Steve Wittig – drums
 Jody Henry – bass

Production
Bill Metoyer – production
Brian Slagel - executive producer
Mixed By Bill Metroyer and Steve Himelfarb at Capitol Studios, Hollywood, Los Angeles 
Gerald McLaughlin - illustration
Mastered by Eddy Schreyer at Capitol Mastering

References

1986 albums
Omen (band) albums
Metal Blade Records albums